Villacastín is a municipality located in the province of Segovia, Castile and León, Spain. According to the 2004 census (INE), the municipality has a population of 1,572 inhabitants.

People 
 Francisco Hernández Ortiz-Pizarro (1555-1613), founder of Fort Calbuco, Chile.

References 

Municipalities in the Province of Segovia